County routes in Otsego County, New York, are signed with the Manual on Uniform Traffic Control Devices-standard yellow-on-blue pentagon route marker. Road names for each route are listed below where applicable; however, most routes are known only by their county route designation. Signage for county routes in Otsego County were posted in July 1965.

List

See also

County routes in New York
List of former state routes in New York

References

External links